Louis XIV is the first album made by the band Louis XIV. Released in November 2003, it was recorded and released independently through the band's record label, Pineapple Recording Group. Selling only a thousand copies, the album was discontinued after the band's signing to major label Atlantic Records in 2004.

Track listing
 "New Murder At The Old Chateau" 
 "Louis XIV"
 "The Grand Apartment"
 "The Hunt"
 "Hall Of Mirrors"
 "It's The Girl That Makes Him Happy"
 "It's The Girl That Makes Him Sad"
 "The Accident"
 "The Ghost Of Chapel Royal"
 "God Killed The Queen"
 "Louis XIV Reprise"

Personnel
 Alex Albrecht – assistant engineer
 James Edwards Armbrust – bass, group member
 Sam Buffa – collage
 Clayton Bulock – violin
 Louis Caverly – violin
 Smith Darby – photography
 Robert Arthur Dodds – guitar
 Jason Hill – bass, guitar, piano, vocals, producer, engineer, string arrangements, mixing
 John Hofstetter – artwork
 Matt Hyde – mixing
 Brian Karscig – bass, guitar, piano, vocals, string arrangements, group member
 Mark Anders Maigaard – drums, group member
 Phil Mucci – photography
 Michelle Negele – viola
 Frank Palumbo – trumpet
 John Rubeli - A&R
 Dave Schultz – mastering
 Andrew Shulman – cello
 Lindsey Troy – vocals

2003 debut albums
Louis XIV (band) albums